The Adelaide Oval Stadium Management Authority (AOSMA) is a company whose directors and members are appointed equally by the South Australian National Football League (SANFL) and the South Australian Cricket Association (SACA). AOSMA is not a public authority. It was created in December 2009 as a non‐profit public company limited by guarantee.

AOSMA manages, operates and maintains the redeveloped Adelaide Oval owned by the South Australian State Government and also the area closely surrounding the stadium (the precinct). AOSMA also provides various services as agent on behalf of the SANFL, SACA and promoters in return for a fee.

There was controversy in 2019 regarding the construction of a hotel attached to the east grandstand of Adelaide Oval that was funded by the State Government loan. Additionally there was controversy around the fact that surplus revenue generated by the new hotel would predominantly benefit the SANFL and SACA rather than the Adelaide Oval.

AOSMA Executive 
In the table below are the current AOSMA executive.

Distributions to SACA and SANFL 
The AOSMA annually distributes a portion of its revenue raised every financial year to both the SACA and SANFL as part of the deal to redevelop Adelaide Oval.

References

Australian companies established in 2009
South Australian National Football League
Event management companies of Australia
Hospitality companies of Australia
Sports organisations of Australia